Grabrovnica is a village in Croatia located in the Pitomača municipality, Virovitica-Podravina County. The village is known as a birthplace of Croatian poet Petar Preradović (1818–1872). His birth house, built in 1775, was renovated in 1968 and 2019, and is open for visitors.

References

Populated places in Virovitica-Podravina County